The Smith & Wesson Model 60 revolver is a 5-shot revolver that is chambered in either .38 Special or .357 Magnum calibers. It was the first revolver produced from stainless steel.

Design
A stainless steel development of the Smith & Wesson Model 36 Chief's Special revolver, the Model 60 has a swing-out cylinder, and features an exposed hammer. It has been in production since 1965, and was the first regular production all stainless steel firearm made. The 1965 model's stainless steel production proved so popular that there was a waiting list at gunshops for up to six months to purchase one. At that time the Model 60 featured a 1.875" barrel and was chambered solely for the .38 Special. Like the Model 36 (Model 50), S&W produced a limited-production version with adjustable sights, the Model 60-1 Chief's Special Target.

In 1996, the stronger J-Magnum frame was introduced and the cylinder was lengthened to support the .357 Magnum round, (as well as the .38 Special). The new model replaced the .38 Special-only version and is available in either a 2.125" or a 3" barrel, with a 5" barrel introduced in 2005.

Sight Systems
With the exception of the Model 60-1, the vast majority of first-generation Model 60 revolvers were produced with fixed sights; modern production revolvers are typically offered with either a fixed or adjustable rear sight and a fixed sight in front.  Despite the reduction in effective range due to the short barrel and consequently reduced sight radius, the 2" barrel version is one of the preferred backup and concealed carry weapons for law enforcement officers and civilians alike to this day.

Variants 
S&W Model 60 Chief's Special: .38 Special, J-frame, 5-shot revolver
Smith & Wesson Ladysmith: .38 Special, 357 Magnum (60-14), J-frame, 5-shot revolver; known as Chief's Special LadySmith
"NY-1": non-catalogued factory variation (bobbed hammer, double action only) made at the request of the NYPD starting in 1987 (S&W identification number: 102308)

References

External links
Modern Firearms page
Smith & Wesson official page
 The Snubnose Files
Shooting Times review

Smith & Wesson revolvers
Revolvers of the United States
.38 Special firearms
.357 Magnum firearms
Police weapons